RLV-TD is India's first uncrewed flying testbed developed for the Indian Space Research Organisation (ISRO)'s Reusable Launch Vehicle Technology Demonstration Programme. It is a scaled down prototype of an eventual two-stage-to-orbit (TSTO) reusable launch vehicle.

It was designed to evaluate various technologies, and development of the final version is expected to take 10 to 15 years. The fully developed RLV is expected to take off vertically like a rocket, deploy a satellite in orbit, return to Earth, and land on a runway.

Development & history
RLV-TD was developed by ISRO under the RLV Technology Demonstration Programme. The Technology Demonstration Programme consists of development of hypersonic rocket with air-breathing engines and the reusable launch vehicle. The RLV-TD is being designed and built at the Vikram Sarabhai Space Centre. Its navigational equipment was supplied by the ISRO Inertial Systems Unit in Thiruvananthapuram and ISRO's Satellite Applications Centre in Ahmedabad. The RLV-TD's landing gear is supplied by Hindustan Aeronautics Limited.

Engines
In January 2006, ISRO completed the design, development and tests of Scramjet (supersonic ramjet) at its Vikram Sarabhai Space Centre in Thiruvananthapuram. During the ground tests, stable supersonic combustion with an inlet Mach number 6 was demonstrated for 7 seconds.

On 3 March 2010, ISRO successfully conducted the flight test of its new sounding rocket ATV-D01 from Satish Dhawan Space Centre in Sriharikota. ATV-D01 weighed 3 tonnes at lift-off and was the heaviest sounding rocket ever developed by ISRO at the time. It was mounted with a passive Scramjet engine. The rocket flew for 7 seconds, achieved Mach number 6 + 0.5 and dynamic pressure 80 + 35 kPa.

Reusable launch vehicle

In January 2012, the design of ISRO's reusable launch vehicle was approved by the "National Review Committee" and clearance was granted to build the vehicle. The vehicle was named "Reusable Launch Vehicle-Technology Demonstrator" (RLV-TD). ISRO aims to bring down the cost of payload delivery to low Earth orbit by 80% from existing $20,000/kg to $4,000/kg.

The RLV-TD was developed with an objective to test various aspects such as hypersonic flight, autoland, powered cruise flight, hypersonic flight using the air-breathing engine propulsion and "Hypersonic Experiment". A series of four RLV-TD test flights are planned by ISRO: HEX (Hypersonic Flight Experiment), LEX (Landing Experiment), REX (Return Flight Experiment), and SPEX (Scramjet Propulsion Experiment).

A team of 750 engineers at Vikram Sarabhai Space Centre, National Aeronautical Laboratory, and Indian Institute of Science worked on the design and development of RLV-TD and the associated rocket. RLV-TD underwent 120 hours of wind tunnel, 5,000 hours of computational fluid dynamics and 1,100 runs of flight simulation tests. RLV-TD has mass of 1.75 tonnes, wingspan of 3.6 meters and overall length of 6.5 meters (excluding the rocket). The vehicle had 600 heat-resistant tiles on its undercarriage and it features delta wings and angled tail fins. Future planned developments include testing an air-breathing propulsion system, which aims to capitalise on the oxygen in the atmosphere instead of liquefied oxygen while in flight.

Hypersonic Flight Experiment

The Hypersonic Flight Experiment (HEX), first of the five test flights was conducted on 23 May 2016. The Sub-orbital  test flight was launched at 07:00 IST (01:30 GMT) from Satish Dhawan Space Centre in Sriharikota ( north of Chennai). Not designed to float, the vehicle disintegrated on impact with water and was not recovered.

RLV-TD was mounted on top of and launched aboard a single stage solid fuel booster (HS9 booster) that was derived from strap-on boosters flown on India's Polar Satellite Launch Vehicle. The heat shield, guidance, navigation and control algorithms were tested at hypersonic speed by accurately steering the vehicle during the descent stage. For the descent back, the test vehicle was programmed to pitch its nose up, exposing silica tiles on its underside and reinforced carbon–carbon nose cap to the airflow into the thick lower layers of the atmosphere. The RLV-TD endured high temperatures of descent through the atmosphere due to its thermal protection system.

All stages of the test flight were tracked by ground station at the launch site and a shipborne terminal. All the mission objectives were met and technologies like autonomous navigation, guidance and control, reusable thermal protection system and descent mission management were successfully validated.

Future developments

RLV LEX
ISRO is planning to conduct air-drop landing experiment (RLV-LEX) during Q1 of 2023 that will take place at Aeronautical Test Range in Challakere, Chitradurga, Karnataka. A prototype RLV will be lifted off with the help of helicopter and later will release from a height of 3 km altitude. During this experiment RLV has to glide, navigate towards the runway and land on the runway autonomously with landing gear, slowing down with deployment of parachute. Vikram Sarabhai Space Centre (VSSC) already successfully established the connection between RLV Interface Systems (RIS) with the helicopter and qualification model for the landing gear was also achieved. As per S. Somanath, the first scaled down landing experiment will happen on defence runway at Challakere where a technology demonstrator weighing four tonnes will be released from an altitude of 3 km and covering a distance of 3 km in runaway. The vehicle has to autonomously glide, navigate and land. This is part of an air drop test to perform aerodynamic studies on air frame developed by ISRO. The previous attempt to check the glide ability was aborted in April 2022 due to a cyclone.

Other Experiments
In other experiments, ISRO intends to carry out an orbital re-entry experiment (REX) and a Scramjet Propulsion Experiment (SPEX) using a reusable carrier vehicle. ISRO Chief K. Sivan stated that the agency had many experiments planned for the RLV-TD, but would only focus on them from 2019, as it was occupied with other missions.

Timeline
 HEX (Hypersonic Flight Experiment): Completed on 23 May 2016.
 LEX (Landing Experiment): Scheduled for 28 January 2023
 REX (Return Flight Experiment): TBA
 SPEX (Scramjet Propulsion Experiment): TBA

See also

 Gaganyaan, a planned crewed orbital spacecraft by India
Avatar (spacecraft)

References

External links

Reusable Launch Vehicle - Technology Demonstration Program (RLV-TD)
RLV-TD HEX01

Space programme of India
Indian Space Research Organisation
Science and technology in India